Warburton School is on the south side of Dunham Road in the village of Warburton, Greater Manchester, England.  It has been converted into a house and is recorded in the National Heritage List for England as a designated Grade II listed building.

The school was built in 1871–72 for the landowner Rowland Egerton-Warburton of Arley Hall, and was designed by the Chester architect John Douglas.  It is constructed in brick with stone and terracotta dressings, and has a tiled roof.  The building has three bays; from the left, the first two bays contain seven-light mullioned windows.  Above the window in the central bay is a dormer gable that contains a three-light mullioned window.  The right bay contains a modern patio window.  Between the left and central bays is a decorated brick chimney stack.  Above the main roof is a hipped bellcote.  In the interior of the building are two pairs of truncated crucks supporting the roof.

See also

Listed buildings in Warburton, Greater Manchester
List of non-ecclesiastical and non-residential works by John Douglas

References

Grade II listed buildings in the Metropolitan Borough of Trafford
School buildings completed in 1872
Houses in Greater Manchester
John Douglas buildings